Rajupur is a village in Saharanpur district of Uttar Pradesh, located 13 kilometers from Deoband.
Nearby villages of Rajupur Nizampur Rampur, Unchagaon, Zahirpur, Rajupur Dudhali Fulasi Shakarpur Mafi Tigri.

Notes

Villages in Saharanpur district